Qeshlaq (also Romanized as Qeshlāq and Qīshlāq) is a village in Valanjerd Rural District, in the Central District of Borujerd County, Lorestan Province, Iran. At the 2006 census, its population was 503, in 144 families.

References 

Towns and villages in Borujerd County